Huddersfield Town's 1987–88 campaign is statistically Town's worst ever season in their league history. Town won only 6 league games all season, had their heaviest ever defeat in their history, conceded 100 league goals in the season and finished 19 points adrift of safety and even 14 points behind 2nd-bottom team Reading. Both of the two managers during the season, Steve Smith and Malcolm Macdonald failed miserably and Macdonald is regarded as one of the worst managers in Town's history.

Squad at the start of the season

Review
The start of the season was at the time, the worst in Town's history. The team lost most of their early games and Steve Smith, a hero during his playing days at Leeds Road, was shown the door on 6 October, after the 2–0 defeat at Birmingham City. Malcolm Macdonald replaced Smith a week later, but it wasn't until the end of the month that Town registered their first win, a 2–1 victory at the end-of-season champions Millwall.

However, a week later, Town recorded their biggest ever loss in their history, going down 10–1 against Manchester City at Maine Road. After that embarrassment, Town recovered slightly going on a run of only 1 defeat in 6 matches. However, this proved to be nothing more than a false dawn and Town's chances of survival would shortly become non-existent.

Following their 2–1 win over Plymouth Argyle on 12 December, Town would only win 2 matches for the remaining 5 months of the season, they were a 1–0 win at Bradford City and amazingly a 1–0 win against a Manchester City side, who 4 months earlier beat them 10–1. They were officially relegated with four games remaining, after a 2-2 draw at home to near neighbours Oldham Athletic, and Town ended up with only 28 points, finishing 14 points behind Reading in 23rd place and a further 5 behind the safety zone of 21st placed West Bromwich Albion. Macdonald was sacked just before the last game of the season against Sheffield United. Eoin Hand would replace Macdonald for the new season in the Third Division.

Squad at the end of the season

Results

Division Two

FA Cup

League Cup

Full Members Cup

Appearances and goals

1987-88
1987–88 Football League Second Division by team